Air-Sport Producent Paralotni is a Polish aircraft manufacturer based in Zakopane and founded by Krzysztof Dudziński in 1989. The company specializes in the design and manufacture of paragliders and wings for powered paragliding.

Dudziński was the Polish National Paragliding Champion in 1993 and 1998 and a member of the Polish National Team.

The company has produced an ever-evolving line of paragliders, including the intermediate Ajos, the recreational Pasat and the cross-country Chinooka. The Buran was designed specifically for powered paragliding.

The company's gliders were noted by reviewer Noel Bertrand in 2003 as being inexpensively priced, compared to other paragliders on the market at that time.

Aircraft 
Aircraft built by Air-Sport:

Air-Sport Aeolus
Air-Sport Ajos
Air-Sport Altus
Air-Sport Buran
Air-Sport Chinook
Air-Sport Daedalus
Air-Sport Euros
Air-Sport Fen
Air-Sport Lahotse
Air-Sport Notos
Air-Sport Notosie
Air-Sport Pasat

References

External links

Aircraft manufacturers of Poland
Paragliders
Polish brands
Manufacturing companies established in 1989
Polish companies established in 1989